SAP domain-containing ribonucleoprotein is a protein that in humans is encoded by the SARNP gene.

References

External links

Further reading